Nuno Jorge Ribeiro Gaspar (born 9 September 1977 in Sobrado, Valongo) is a Portuguese former professional road bicycle racer, who rode professionally between 2000 and 2014 for the , ,  (two spells),  and  teams. He now works as a directeur sportif for his final professional team, UCI Continental team .

He was the winner of the 2003 Volta a Portugal, and he also placed first in the 2009 edition, however he was later disqualified due to testing positive for CERA in a doping test and was banned for two years.

Upon returning from the ban, Ribeiro joined . He remained with the team until the end of the 2013 season, when he joined .

Major results 

2002
 4th Gran Premio de Llodio
 9th Overall Volta a Portugal
2003
 1st Overall Volta a Portugal
1st Stage 5
 1st  Mountains classification Tour de Pologne
 2nd Road race, National Road Championships
 7th Overall Troféu Joaquim Agostinho
2004
 2nd Road race, National Road Championships
 3rd Overall Volta a Portugal
 9th Overall Troféu Joaquim Agostinho
2006
 5th Overall Troféu Joaquim Agostinho
 6th Overall Volta ao Alentejo
2007
 7th Overall GP Internacional Paredes Rota dos Móveis
2008
 1st Overall GP CTT Correios de Portugal
 1st Stage 8 Volta a Portugal
 9th Overall GP Internacional Paredes Rota dos Móveis
2009
 1st Overall Volta a Portugal
1st Stage 10
 2nd Subida al Naranco
 3rd Overall GP Internacional Paredes Rota dos Móveis
 4th Overall Vuelta a Asturias
2012
 8th Overall Volta a Portugal
2013
 9th Overall Volta a Portugal
2014
 9th Overall Tour do Rio

See also 
 List of doping cases in sport

References

External links 

1977 births
Living people
Cyclists at the 2004 Summer Olympics
Cyclists at the 2008 Summer Olympics
Portuguese male cyclists
Olympic cyclists of Portugal
Doping cases in cycling
Portuguese sportspeople in doping cases
Volta a Portugal winners